Ekkachai Nophajinda or pen name Yor Yoeng (June 21, 1953 – March 6, 1997) was a famous Thai sport journalist, columnist, television personality from Channel 7 (Thailand) and chairman businesspeople of Siam Sport Syndicate.

Biography
He was born on June 21, 1953, in Bangkok. He was son of Praithoon and Urai Nophajinda, he was a younger-brother as Tarawut Nophajinda.

He was work for sport journalist and columnist between 1974 and 1997 and he was married with Yuree Weerasukhon in 1986, and they was a daughter as Taweephorn Nophajinda.

He died on March 6, 1997, in Bangkok from heart failure; he was age 43.

References

External links
 หน้าสำหรับแฟน "เอกชัย นพจินดา" from Facebook, written by Taweephorn Nophajinda, his daughter.

1953 births
1997 deaths
Asian newspaper editors
Ekkachai Nophajinda
Ekkachai Nophajinda
Thai television personalities
Ekkachai Nophajinda
20th-century journalists